This article contains profiles and information for the characters of the anime and manga series Zombie-Loan.

Protagonists

The story follows Michiru Kita when she witnesses Chika Akatsuki and Shito Tachibana dealing with zombies at the school. After realizing what her "eyes" are seeing, she helps Chika and Shito search for zombies. After Chika and Shito save her life by taking on the debt of healing her, she accompanies them until they can repay their debt to the Z-loan Office.

Michiru Kita

 possesses Shinigami Eyes, which allows her to see a ring on a person's neck, indicating their impending death. She has hated her gift ever since she saw dark rings around her parents' necks, who died in an accident after the rings turned jet black. She now wears glasses that can subdue her gift, allowing her to live her life normally. Since the death of her parents, she has felt numb, living, but having no will to achieve anything or even care if she dies or not, an attitude which disgusts Shito. As the manga continues, Michiru develops the will to live and become stronger to protect her friends. Michiru first meets Chika and Shito in the hallways of her school, accidentally tripping over Chika's hand. When she finds out their secret, they initially think of killing her, but when they find out that she has Shinigami Eyes, they instead inform her that she will be using her powers to help them hunt and fight zombies, despite her protests. After various failures, and meeting other members of the Z-Loan office, Michiru comes to accept her new job. She often takes the brunt of Chika's abuse and is initially called '500-yen' by him, because he believes she owes him ¥500. He later begins to call her a "gopher" since she often does what other people ask of her without question. In chapter 32, Michiru starts going out with Soutetsu, but the relationship ends after the first date. In volume 8 of the manga, Michiru roams around Chika's soul in search for a way to help cure him of his insanity. Later she destroys Carmella by crushing her 'core' during an incident when she and the others meet her and Chitose for the first time. In Volume 10, she accidentally gains access into the WFO and meets some members of the Akashic Record Reform Committee, including Hakka and Shiba Reiichiro. There, she is revealed to be a Singularity and not a human. It is also revealed that she has the ability to control space dimensions, an ability that Carmella could control. She is often attached to Zarame, the former Grim Reaper, with whom she communicates as she understands what he says all the time. She is very fond of cute things.

Chika Akatsuki

, after surviving an accident with Shito six months prior to the start of the series, is a zombie. His attitude is rather lively and extroverted, but he is also short-tempered; he is often seen beating Michiru for her various failures. As the story progresses, he becomes fond of Michiru, becoming jealous when she shows interest in someone. He claims to dislike Shito but appears to be fonder of Shito than Shito is of him. Chika is linked with Shito by a spiritual chain, which cannot be seen by normal people. This chain allows them to switch their right hands with each other; due to the terms of their contract, their real right hands, which they both lost in the accident, were switched when they were revived by the Zombie-Loan. With Shito's right hand, which is actually Chika's original right hand, Chika has the ability to generate a katana possessing Shinigami abilities. With the katana, Chika is able to guide the souls of those zombies they defeat to Heaven. Though often seen with a short temper, Chika has a genuine care for those he defeats and often performs their memorial with great sympathy. Though they have free will and emotions, both Chika and Shito are still considered zombies, so his ultimate goal is to regain his life once again. Surprisingly, Chika has a very cheery family, though he does not live with them since he lives in the special dorms with the others. His father turns out to be a doting cross-dresser who annoys Chika constantly by fussing over him. His sister tends to pay more attention to her cellphone and is basically indifferent to what is going on around her, though Chika adores her and wants her affection. However, he is worried that when he gets home, he will be treated like an outcast due to the circumstances surrounding his hand; he is worried that it will rot off suddenly, and his family will detest and fear him. Much about his mother remains a mystery to him, although in the manga it is revealed that during his childhood years, while his father and little sister were abroad, she left him alone in the house for work and never returned, leaving him lonely and hungry. In volume 7 of the manga, he loses control of his sanity due to this sad past and behaves completely like an ordinary zombie, craving for human and zombie flesh. With the help of Michiru and the others, he returns to normal in time for the conflict in which they meet Carmella and Chitose of the ARRC.

Shito Tachibana

 is referred to as the first survivor in the accident six months prior to the series. Due to his looks and attitude, he is idolized by the female students, though he seems not to care. He is generally a much more approachable person than Chika, but certain situations and people cause him to act cold and indifferent. Shito is linked with Chika by a spiritual chain. When he attaches Chika's right hand, or rather his own original right hand, he can generate a 9½ inch revolver, which has the power to harm zombies with its spiritual bullets using his own ectoplasm. In contrast to Chika's ability to guide souls to Heaven, Shito is able to guide souls to Hell. It is not at first known what Shito wants to gain through the contract with the Zombie Loan office; while Chika wants to regain his life, Shito is revealed to never have been alive in the first place. It is later revealed to be because of the situation with his and Chika's hands being swapped that he agrees to the contract. Shito's feelings toward others are often a mystery, as he keeps them to himself and reveals little of what is on his mind. For instance, though they are always together, Chika and Shito often act far from friends; they are of course only close together because if they are apart, their right hands will begin to rot due to being taken too far from their original owners. However, Shito's actions show that he thinks of Chika as at least a friend. Shito's history is at first shrouded in mystery. It is revealed over time that Shito holds a very high status as a tool of the notorious Xu Fu Mafia. He is acquainted with Toho, a Mafia member, who views him as a "perfect monster", yet also as "disgustingly beautiful" and as an important asset. Shito hates Toho due to the frequent torture that Toho personally inflicted upon Shito himself.

Later it is revealed to the other characters that Shito did not die on the same day as Chika, but was in fact already a zombie before the bus accident that caused their present situation, and that he was placed at the school under the disguise of a normal sixteen-year-old human by the Zombie Loan office after the accident. It becomes known that Shito's mother, Chizuru, was also a zombie, and through the "Corpse Release Spell", Shito was actually born a zombie out of a 7-year pregnancy. This is why he does not have any sympathy for those who have life yet do not want it. He states his disgust when he first meets Michiru and she states that if she dies then that is simply the way things are. His exact age seems to be 150 or so years old (revealed in vol.6 chap.31), but he met Bekkō in Shanghai, China, at the end of the nineteenth century looking just as he does now. Toho has also observed that he has been handed down for generations. No matter how many wounds Shito receives, he is able to live on until the end of the world, though there is most likely a limit to how much damage he can take. Despite his cold attitude toward others at the beginning of the series, he eventually begins to open up to others. For instance, after being kidnapped by Yoshizumi in episode 8, he befriends one of Yoshizumi's golems, because she reminds him of himself, revealing more of his kind, caring side. Shito even thinks of taking care of her, until Yoshizumi's assistant, Nogi, shoots her in the head.

In Volume 10, he gets kidnapped by Xu Fu and is used as an exorcist experiment by Toho. His body is then taken over by Lao Ye through the perfected "Corpse Release Spell". This is done by Lao Ye tearing Koyomi's "Dead Man Tongue" out, literally, and then eating it. After the spell is complete, Shito eventually regains his senses, but only after Koyomi sacrifices herself to return his soul to his body. Afterwards he learns from Yomi that Koyomi did this because she loved him, by which he is shocked and saddened. Some interesting facts about Shito are that despite his stoic nature, his room in the dorm is filled with colorful junk and campy collectibles, including his favorite "Betty" collection, which resembles a "Bob's Big Boy" in appearance, and he can apparently tell if any of these are moved as little as two millimeters. Despite finding all these objects important, to the bewilderment of others, his most precious item is a decorative comb with descriptive flowers called lycoris radiata engraved onto it. It is revealed to have been given to him by his mother, whom he was deeply in love with, despite their being related.

It is so important to him, in fact, that on one occasion when Michiru finds this comb and accidentally picks it up, when she returns it to Shito he is so enraged at the idea of her even touching it that he threatens to kill her if she does so again. He later comes to trust Michiru and gives her the comb for safekeeping. Later, he began to treat Michiru and Chika as close friends. It is shown that Shito is a bad drunk, and often behaves unlike himself and acts romantically around others, even asking both Michiru and Sotetsu for a kiss.

Antagonists

Mafia Xu Fu

Touhou

Touhou is an exorcist, who uses powerful transformational symbol magic and works for the continental Mafia Xu Fu. It seems he was put in charge of keeping an eye on Shito, whom he admires and considers to be a "perfect monster", yet "disgustingly beautiful". He abuses Shito physically and mentally through his symbol magic at times. He has reasonable sources, and is always a bit ahead of the Z-Loan. His position of taking care of Shito and working for Xu Fu has been passed down for generations. He mentions having a wife. In volume 10 of the manga, he commences an exorcist experiment with Shito's body, Koyomi's "Dead Man's Tongue", and Xu Fu's leader, whom he calls "Lao Ye". It is later revealed he and his father have been searching for a way to end Lao Ye's rule and free his clan from the Xu Fu. However, in exchange for finishing off Lao Ye, his body is covered with curses, which quickly end up killing him.

Lao Ye
Lao Ye is the leader of the Xu Fu, and is kept alive through Xu Fu magic until the day he can transfer his body into Shito. He held feelings for Chizuru, but she was already to marry someone else; this resulted in Lao Ye killing her husband-to-be. When Chizuru committed suicide out of grief, Lao Ye revived her as a zombie out his twisted desire to be with her. After Chizuru gave birth to Shito and Lao Ye saw Shito didn't age past his prime, he desired the same immortality, ordering his original Toho to cast the incomplete Corpse Release Spell on him; the end result was an immortal life, but at the cost of a heavily immacipated body. Throughout the generations, Lao Ye had the spell redone and took in Shito's blood to curb the negative effects. In the present day, he is barely kept alive by life-support. He is killed by Touhou.

Akashic Record Reform Committee

Yoshizumi

Yoshizumi is a scientist who wants eternal life. He captures Shito to try to learn how to create a being such as himself. He creates many golems and zombies and treats them as monsters or trash. His golem Phalanx was the closest he got to eternal life. He is killed when a poison is put inside him, degenerating all his cells.

Carmella

 is a mysterious woman who works for the Akashic Record Reform Committee (ARRC). She has contacted Doctor Yoshizumi numerous times. Although shrouded in mystery, she indicates that the ARRC know important events in the future. She takes on the job of searching for perfect targets to be self-aware zombies and is responsible for Shiba and Yoshizumi being illegal zombies. She has the ability to control dimensions, like Michiru. Her core is crushed by Michiru in Volume 8 of the manga.

Chitose

Another member of the Akashic Record Reform Committee (ARRC), Chitose appears briefly in episode 6 and is fully introduced in episode 12. Chitose works with Carmella, and has a stubborn, impatient, short-tempered attitude. He shows deep hatred towards the Z-Loan office, often aiming to get rid of them at all costs. He specializes in a unique ability to use darts for all sorts of purposes, whether it be for fighting or to control other people's actions. Despite his habit of teasing Carmella at times, he does show some respect for her as a partner in the committee. This is evidently true when he gets enraged after Michiru crushes Carmella's core. He fondly respects, admires, and looks up to the ARRC's president, who is actually Hakka. In Volume 8 of the manga, during his first hot conflict with the trios of Z-Loan and A-Loan, his left eye gets injured by Chika, resulting in him wearing an eye-patch in the later volumes. In Volume 11, he gets caught by Z-Loan after their conflict against Toho and Xu Fu. As a result, his core is confiscated by Bekko and he remains in the same state as the Grim Reaper as punishment. His core is "on loan" to Michiru, who uses it to create a body for herself at the end of the story.

Neli
Neli is another member of ARRC, and Bekko's sister. She appears in volume 10 with Zen under her control. When Shuuji tries to get close to Zen, she has him attack Shuuji, and she tries to tear his ties to life not knowing of his double contract. When Bekko arrives to get his payment from Shito and Chika, he tells her to be good, and not cause trouble, and she refers to him as brother.

Other characters

Z-Loan Office
Zombie Loan Office are a group of people who give loans to the dead in exchange for life. In return, they must gather up a large sum of money by normal means, or by working for Zombie Loan and hunting down illegal zombies, zombies that have not been given life by an official company. The Z-Loan office is managed by Bekko, the Ferryman.

Bekko

 is the manager of the Z-Loan office and a Ferryman; he is the one who gives people their loans. Although he appears to be greedy, Bekkō is not stingy when it comes to giving proper burials for the zombies they have come in contact with or giving money to the zombies' families. He is shown to be quite good at table tennis, defeating Shito in episode 7 without letting Shito even take a point off him. Since he is at least old enough to have met Shito in Shanghai at the end of the nineteenth century, he is not human, though as Michiru has not noticed a black ring on his neck he cannot be a zombie either. As a Ferryman, he is neither human nor zombie. He is one of the Seven Ferrymen in a certain River Department Council of the WFO. In episode 12 of the anime, other Ferrymen of the council say that his current job of giving humans loans (in other words, making them zombies to kill other illegal zombies) is considered illegal as well, although their new president, Hakka, seems to support Bekkō more, resulting in him creating A-Loan.

Yuuta

 is the Z-Loan office assistant who has an androgynous appearance and has the unique ability to heal using ectoplasm. His job mostly consists of data-gathering, medical treatments, answering phones, and making tea. He likes to joke around and often pretends that his hands, which he named Ken Ken and Kon Kon, can talk. He is a zombie with a loan as well. He is also shown to wear various hats that resemble animal's ears. He and Bekkō are similar in the sense that they both have an eye for money.

Otsu Sawatari

 is another zombie, who uses his real job as a medical graduate student to investigate autopsies and other zombie-related cases. Often mistaken for a Yakuza from his crew cut, sunglasses, smart casual dress, and demeanor, he is actually one of the brightest in his class. He is shown fighting using ectoplasmic flames that surround his hands. Chika often calls him "Ossan" (old man), but claims he said "Otsu-san" out of respect. Otsu's age is 24.

Sotetsu Asou

 is a resident of the same dormitory that Michiru lives in, but he is an "adventurous epicurean" (as he calls himself in episode 9), traveling from country to country. Since he is also a zombie-loaner, he only comes back from his trips when his loan extends. Sotetsu is referred to as the "Dabu King", the school's "living legend". His weapon takes the form of a European-like axe, which comes out of his right hand. He rides a cool bike. He has an interest in food, especially weird foreign cuisine. Koyomi once reveals to Michiru an incident when she was drunk after drinking Fantan and wakes up to find herself with Sotetsu naked in bed. As of chapter 32, he and Michiru become an official couple, but they break up in chapter 50. Later, he is assigned to be Bekkō's bodyguard.

Koyomi Yoimachi

 is a resident of the same dormitory Michiru resides in. She is a very cheerful girl, but she also has a double personality. Unlike Koyomi's innocent and sweet exterior, her other personality, "Yomi", is without reserves and is usually fondling Michiru, despite the latter's unwillingness to do so. It appears that Michiru is the only person able to awaken this alter ego of Koyomi's, merely by kissing her or simply calling her by name. Yomi also has a special ability called the "Dead Man's Tongue", which allows her to channel dead people's words. While Yomi seems to dislike everyone other than Michiru, Koyomi seems to have a slight crush on Sotetsu Aso, although this is not really true. Koyomi feels nervous around him because of a previous shocking incident that happened after getting drunk by drinking too much Fantan, when she woke up to find herself with Sotetsu naked in the same bed. It turns out that Koyomi likes someone else and that is Shito. In volume 8 of the manga, Yomi takes on the form of a white snake, and in volume 10, when Toho uses Koyomi's tongue to obtain the "Dead Man's Tongue" ability for an exorcist experiment Yomi uses her snake form as a new tongue. In volume 10, Koyomi awakens and finds herself with Shito and Toho. She threatens Toho and vows to protect Shito, who is in a daze. It is mentioned by Yomi and Michiru that Koyomi had fallen unconscious, and when Chika and the others come Koyomi is lying on the ground in a pool of blood at Shito's feet (currently possessed), her "Dead-Man's Tongue" having been bitten out of her mouth and eaten by "Lao Ye". Later in volume 11, Yomi takes over Koyomi's body as Koyomi herself is dead due to a sacrifice to bring Shito's soul back into him. In chapter 65, Yomi tells Michiru that she is actually a boy; this is hinted at in earlier chapters when Michiru learns that Yomi was made from the spirits of the slaughtered boys from the Yoitsuhara clan.

Shimotsuki Kuze

 is the director of the dormitory Michiru resides in. She is fond of detective games. Despite her obvious young age, she is quite intelligent and usually speaks in an adult manner. Following the staff's trip to the hot springs, she has a pet werewolf whom she educates in the city under the name of Raika. She sends him to Z-Loan to obtain experience in order to become stronger. She is known to have mysterious powers which she uses to tame Raika, and also abilities that enable her to open 'doors' to different supernatural worlds. She also knows a lot about Bekkō and the WFO.

Sougiya

More often referred to as the Undertaker, he works to repay his debt through an actual job instead of zombie hunting, believing that it is too violent and dangerous a method that is beneath him. However, when it becomes absolutely necessary, it is revealed that he is in fact able to fight zombies using a rosary and incantations. It is implied that his wife is dead, and he chooses to take the zombie loan so as not to leave his daughter Misora alone.

A-Loan Office
An opposition to the Z-Loan, they were made recently and are supposed to be "the revolution" to the loan system. They are the rivals to the Z-Loan Office and are contrasted to the protagonists. However, later on in the manga (Volumes 10-11), both A-Loan and Z-Loan are involved in a conflict against Toho and some others, resulting in them somehow getting along with each other.

Zen Inubashiri

 is a high school junior, despite his short height. His weapons are two ectoplasmic Chinese broad swords. He takes on the leader position in the trio. He is also seen bickering multiple times with Chika. He develops a crush on Michiru after she bandages his head wound during a zombie hunt, often greeting her with a "Yo meganekko!" whenever they meet. In the manga, Chitose, a member of ARRC, uses him as a 'puppet' to fight against his comrades and the members of Z-Loan. He then disappears in Volume 8 after a conflict between the two loan offices and Carmella and Chitose, only to reappear later on in Volume 10 under the control of a mysterious girl called Neli. Somehow in volume 11 he breaks free from Neli's control.

Toko Touma

 is a female high school sophomore, who has the ability to locate zombies from long distances. She dislikes Michiru because of Zen's attraction to her. This is because she is deeply fond of Zen. Peach-Pit once describes her as a highly optimistic character, unlike Michiru who sometimes thinks negatively of herself. She is hinted to be related to Toho in the manga, even having similar abilities. She appears in Hong Kong in Volume 10 of the manga, in a duty to help kidnap Shito for Xu Fu. She later helps Z-Loan, notably Chika and Shuji, in rescuing Shito. It is revealed in the 10th volume that she and Zen were raised by the same man, despite them not being related, nor is she a zombie.

Shūuji Tsugumi

 is a tall, high school freshman, who uses a machine gun as his main weapon. He has a laid-back personality and finds Shito's enthusiasm for collecting figures sickening. He claims to have good luck, proven when he finds a Rare Betty in a snack box and wins the lottery. He seems to be in love with Toko as he seems to be highly concerned for her welfare and searches for her in Hong Kong. Also, during the time Zen becomes possessed, with Toko going into hysterics, Shuji tries to calm her down and claims that he would stay by her side. He meets up with Chika and Shito in Hong Kong, where they find themselves caught up in a conflict against Touhou and the Mafia Xu Fu. He helps them fight Touhou and the Xu Fu, and during the fight his ties with the contract are broken by a member of ARCC. While he had been left alone in Japan, he formed a double contract with Bekkō, preventing him and the other A-Loan members from dying. He doesn't get along with Shito well, but in volume 10 he and Chika seem to be friendly towards each other, although this may just be because they are both working together to survive, not actually joining sides.

Others

Reiichirou Shiba

 is an illegal zombie, known as the "Butterfly", and an old acquaintance of Chika's. Shiba appears to be a calm, cool, agreeable, highly intellectual person, and never seems to ask too many questions. Despite this, Shiba gains the great dislike of Shito due to his suspicious vast amount of knowledge on the Butterfly case. He and Chika get along fairly well since they were best friends in middle school. He is easily bored, but with Chika in his life, things were never dull until they parted ways when they entered high school. It is revealed that he killed himself by jumping off the roof, simply because he was bored of the monotonous life he had. He is the first zombie in the series to be reaped by the Grim Reaper instead of a member of the Zombie Loan. He initially fights by projecting and controlling an ectoplasmic knife, but by volume 8, he is shown to be using a scythe. It is later revealed that he is the one who stole the Zarame's 'core', resulting in him turning into a fake Grim Reaper. He later sides with the ARRC. He seems to have an increasing interest in Michiru and often calls her cute whenever he gets the chance. He claims in volume 11 that his attraction to her is due to her abnormal nature, which he finds to be fascinating. Because he himself is also abnormal, he would never be attracted to the plain, normal girls in the world of humans.

Zarame

Zarame is a Shinigami or nature that reaps souls. His entire body, except for his left eye, is covered in bandages. It is formed by the materialization of astral around a powerful energy source known as the 'core', which is later stolen by a human he is trying to reap, who is later revealed to be Shiba. Not having a body, he is forced to reside in a super deformed state that Michiru thinks is adorable. However, as shown in chapter 41, he can temporarily transform into his original form as long as he is near Michiru. He is known by his associate Koume as Zarame-sama, which translates into English as granulated sugar or brown sugar, and has the ability to generate a scythe at will. He can only speak in muffled, high-pitched, squeaky noises, due to the bandages across his mouth and his super deformed state, but both Michiru and Koume hear him as speaking normally, though most of what he says are threats or insults. It appears that Yomi can also hear and understand Zarame when he speaks, as seen in chapter 75. Currently, he still does not have his 'core' back, but seems content to perch on Michiru's shoulder. After being attached to her, he became protective over her as well.

Koume

 is a little girl who used to work for the Grim Reaper. She had been out of her job since Zarame-sama had his 'core' taken away, and is now seen working at various places in the supernatural world, sometimes offering help to the members of the Z-Loan office. She is seen with very little expression and seems to speak in a very deadpan manner. Both she and Michiru are able to understand whatever the Grim Reaper says.

Lyca

 is a werewolf who has been alive for a long time. Lyca lives through the deaths of all his kin, and is left to live in a cave, surrounded by bones, all by himself. He makes his first appearance in Volume 3, Payment 18, when the main characters are staying at the hot springs. The main characters make their way to Lyca's cave, where Kuze Shimotsuki tames him with mysterious powers. She takes him back to the city, and he is eventually sent to Z-Loan, under the belief that experience will make him stronger. Lyca wishes to be stronger for the sake of protecting Shimotsuki. Lyca also begins going to the same school as Michiru, Chika, and Shito. He learns human speech but still refers to himself in the third person. He lets Michiru pat him on the head, but bites people he doesn't like, or people who treat him like an animal. He also seems to dislike males. Lyca shows a certain protectiveness of Shimotsuki, and can sense any 'doors' leading to other supernatural worlds opened by her.

Hakka

Hakka is the new President of the Ferrymen River Department in WFO. His personality slightly resembles that of Bekkō's and Chika's father: he is sometimes serious, cool, and mysterious, but at most other times he can be simply whimsical. He shows a rather sickening admiration and friendliness towards Bekkō, whom he calls "Bekkō-chan", even feeling jealous of him because he has a 'nicer ass'. Motivated by Bekkō's efforts in the Z-Loan office, he too sets up a loan company called A-Loan (Alive-Loan) and employs the trio Zen, Toko, and Shuji. In fact, he is also the President of the ARRC (Akashic Record Reform Committee), and his real aim for creating A-Loan is to get rid of Z-Loan. He seems to know a lot about the backgrounds and history of others such as Shiba and Michiru. In Volume 10 of the manga he reveals to Michiru that she is a Singularity and not a human, and also his child.

Life
Life is the golem that Shito bonds with when captured by Yoshizumi. A little golem that cannot speak, but is shown to have feelings and emotions, she is killed by Yoshizumi's assistant just as Shito tells her he will take care of her. Shito names her 'Life' because he believes she has something in her life that makes her human.

Kanro
A Ferrywoman who's part of the Committee of Seven. She only appears in the manga (Volume 12, Chapter 67). Kanro has a grudge against Bekko due to him rejecting her marriage in the past. She insists that anyone is fine as long as they are male and can "reproduce".

Kuro
A Ferryman who's part of the Committee of Seven. He only appears in the manga (Volume 13, Chapter 79). Not much is known about him though it's hinted that he's happy-going to the point of being 'another annoying character'.

References

Lists of anime and manga characters